Tomer Haliva (born September 27, 1979) is an Israeli football full back playing for Maccabi Be'er Sheva.

Haliva began his career as a defender for Hapoel Be'er Sheva youth team, and in 1997-1998 season he moved to the first team of the club. He played for Be'er Sheva sporadically until 2004–2005, moving to other lower league clubs the likes of Hapoel Tzafririm Holon (national league at the time) and Hapoel Mashosh-Segev Shalom (Liga Bet).

In 2005-2006 Haliva transferred to Beitar Jerusalem and a year later he moved to Hapoel Tel Aviv and signed a 3 years-contract, but on January he transferred to F.C. Ashdod.

References

1979 births
Living people
Israeli footballers
Hapoel Be'er Sheva F.C. players
Hapoel Tzafririm Holon F.C. players
Beitar Jerusalem F.C. players
Hapoel Tel Aviv F.C. players
F.C. Ashdod players
Hapoel Ironi Kiryat Shmona F.C. players
Hapoel Bnei Lod F.C. players
Hakoah Maccabi Amidar Ramat Gan F.C. players
Maccabi Be'er Sheva F.C. players
Liga Leumit players
Israeli Premier League players
Footballers from Beersheba
Association football defenders